"Boom Clap" is a song by English singer and songwriter Charli XCX, released as the first single from the soundtrack album of The Fault in Our Stars (2014) and is also featured on XCX's second studio album, Sucker. There are two existing mixes of this song: the first and original one is heard in the film, the film's soundtrack, and the music video shot in Amsterdam; the second mix is heard on the music video shot in Japan and in Sucker.

The single peaked at number six on the UK Singles Chart and number eight on the US Billboard Hot 100 and topped the Mainstream Top 40, as well as peaking inside the top ten of the charts in Australia, Canada, New Zealand, Ireland and Italy. This song is featured as downloadable content on Just Dance 2015.

Background and composition

"Boom Clap" is a "radio-ready" electropop and synth-pop ballad, written by Charli XCX, Fredrik Berger, Patrik Berger and Stefan Gräslund. The song was initially written during writing sessions for XCX's debut studio album, True Romance, then later offered to singer and actress Hilary Duff for her new album. Once Duff's management declined the offer, XCX decided to use the song as her contribution to The Fault in Our Stars motion picture soundtrack. In a later interview, Duff said she had no idea that XCX had offered the song to her people and would have accepted the song if she had known. The song is composed in the key of E major.

Critical reception
"Boom Clap" received positive reviews from music critics. 4Music said the song was "infectious" and a "feelgood track [which] contrasts softly-sung verses with a big attitude-packed chorus" resulting in a song that was "catchier than the clap." Spin listed "Boom Clap" at number 24 on its list of "The 101 Best Songs of 2014," writing that "Charli XCX's excellent use of onomatopoeia gives this intoxicated Sucker cut her most unforgettable chorus yet." Pitchfork named it the 37th best song of 2014. In January 2015, "Boom Clap" was ranked at number eight on The Village Voices annual year-end Pazz & Jop critics' poll. In April 2022, Clash listed the song among the 17 best of Charli's songs, with Isabella Miller stating that "it captures the essence of youth culture with timeless stylistic and lyrical content that awakens the 2014 Tumblr teen in us all."

Commercial performance
The song debuted at number 62 on the Billboard Hot 100 on the week dated 21 June 2014, becoming XCX's first entry as a lead artist. On 28 June 2014, the song jumped to number 29, becoming her first top-40 hit as a lead artist. The song became XCX's first top 10 hit as a solo artist (after her features on "I Love It" and "Fancy") and re-entered the top ten twice before peaking at number eight. The song has sold more than 3 million copies in the United States. "Boom Clap" also peaked at number one on the Mainstream Top 40 chart and topped Dance Airplay. In the UK the song has sold over 200,000 copies and has received a silver certification.

Music videos
The accompanying music video for "Boom Clap", directed by Sing J. Lee, was filmed in Amsterdam and premiered on 2 June 2014. The video features brief clips from The Fault in Our Stars set to the song as well as on-screen text written in the style of the book cover and film poster.

An alternative music video for the song, directed by Kazuya Murayama, was filmed in Tokyo and premiered on 29 October 2014.

Live performances

Charli XCX performed the song for the first time on The Fault in Our Stars Live Stream Event on 14 May 2014. She also performed the song at the 2014 MTV Video Music Awards pre-show on 24 August. The song was part of the setlist of Charli's first headlining concert tour Girl Power North America Tour.

Charli XCX performed the song followed by "Break the Rules" at the 2014 MTV Europe Music Awards. She also performed the song along with "Break the Rules" at the American Music Awards of 2014; when she performed "Boom Clap" she wore a prom dress; after the song she performed her second song, removed her dress with another outfit underneath, and went wild at the show and destroyed parts of her set. She also performed the song on Saturday Night Live.

Charli XCX performed the song in 1989 World Tour with Taylor Swift in Toronto on 3 October 2015.

Track listings
Digital download
 "Boom Clap" – 2:49
Digital download – remixes
 "Boom Clap" (Aeroplane Remix) – 5:14
 "Boom Clap" (ASTR Remix) – 3:19
 "Boom Clap" (Surkin Remix) – 3:40
 "Boom Clap" (Elk Road Remix) – 3:40
 "Boom Clap" (Cahill Remix) – 5:28
CD single
 "Boom Clap" – 2:50
 "Boom Clap" (Aeroplane Remix) – 5:15

Charts

Weekly charts

Year-end charts

Certifications

Release history

See also
 List of Billboard Hot 100 top-ten singles in 2014
 List of Billboard Mainstream Top 40 number-one songs of 2014

References

2010s ballads
2014 singles
2014 songs
Atlantic Records singles
Charli XCX songs
Electropop ballads
The Fault in Our Stars (film)
Songs written for films
Songs written by Charli XCX
Songs written by Patrik Berger (record producer)